Burkina Faso–Turkey relations are the foreign relations between Burkina Faso and Turkey.
Turkey and Burkina Faso enjoy strong and friendly bilateral relations. Bilateral relations gained momentum after the opening of the Turkish Embassy in Ouagadougou and the Embassy of Burkina Faso in Ankara in 2012 and in 2014 respectively. 

Burkina Faso and Turkey are both members of the United Nations, International Monetary Fund, World Bank and the World Trade Organization.

Presidential Visits

Economic Relations 
Burkina Faso  receives preferential trade benefits as a result of the trade and investment framework agreements in the Second Session of the Joint Economic Commission in Ouagadougou on October 2-3, 2019.
Trade volume between the two countries was 52.2 million USD in 2019 (Turkish exports/imports: 31.4/20.8 million USD). 
Turkish development assistance to Burkina Faso through TIKA and the Turkish Red Crescent focuses on increasing food security and improving education.
There are direct flights from Istanbul to Ouagadougou with a frequency of 4 times a week since 2012.

Military Relations 
Turkey and Burkina Faso engage in a number of military training and exchange programs through the G5 Sahel Joint Force, to which Turkey has pledged 5 million USD in order to contribute to regional peace and stability in the Sahell.

See also 

 Foreign relations of Burkina Faso
 Foreign relations of Turkey

References 

Burkina Faso–Turkey relations
Turkey
Bilateral relations of Turkey